Lee Eun-hee may refer to:
 Lee Eun-hee (judoka)
 Lee Eun-hee (figure skater)
 Lee Eun-hee (table tennis)
 Lee Eun-hee (swimmer)